Thalaivasal is a town in the Salem district of Tamil Nadu, India.
It is located 18 km away from the Sub-district headquarter Attur and 70 km away from the Salem District Headquarter.
It is one of the Taluks of the Salem District

The Thalaivasal Taluk is near Attur Circle. Thalaivasal consists of 35 Panchayats. It has the control over the 35 Panchayats. The Regional Development Office of the Panchayat Union operates at the Mummudi, Thalaivasal which is known as Union Office.
 
According to the 2011 census, the total population of the headquarter panchayat is 1,35,026. The population of the Scheduled castes is 41,523. The population of the Scheduled tribe is 1,080.

Etymology
In Tamil, the word Thalai means "head", and vasal means "entrance". The town was an entrance to the Kingdom of Mysore and Hoysala Empire via the Attur pass; it was therefore named "Thalaivasal".

History
Hoysalas invaded the Magadai country and established their headquarters at Aragalur in the 12th century CE. Tippu Sultan and Hyder Ali likely visited places around Thalaivasal in the 18th century.

Government
Government establishments in Thalaivasal include the Panchayat Union, a sub-registrar office, a police station, and a primary health care unit. Thalaivasal is a state assembly seat.

Politics
Thalaivasal is part of the Kallakurichi (Lok Sabha constituency) assembly constituency and Gangavalli (State Assembly constituency).

Geography 
Vasishta Nadi originates from the Salem district, flowing through Attur, Thalaivasal and Cuddalore district. This river flows through Tiruchirapalli and joins Sweta Nadi before flowing into the Bay of Bengal. Vasishta river flows from the southern part of the village.

Economy
A farmers' market is organized every Tuesday. There is also an agricultural market every morning for the collection of farmers' harvests by wholesale dealers, where a variety of vegetables are available. It is the second highest vegetable trading market in Tamil Nadu.
Cattle growing, Rice mills and Sago factories form major source of economy.

Transportation
Thalaivasal is on National Highway 68. It is connected to Trichy through Veeraganur. TNSTC (Tamil Nadu State Transport Corporation) buses are available from Salem district and Kallakurichi, from where transport can be taken for longer distances.

Railway Station is located 3 km away from the Headquarter of Thalaivasal
Salem to Virudhachalam Passengers Train is available at this station daily.

Chinnasalem town's railway station serves as a station for trains en route to Mettur, Cuddalore, Nagore, Pondicherry, Salem, Coimbatore, Mangalore, Bangalore, Chennai

Religion
Thalaivasal is home to Hindu temples such as Thalaivasal Thirukarugavur Temple and Narasimha Swami Temple. Also there is a Mosque and St. Joseph's Church located in the town.

Tourism
The Narasimha Swami temple draws a significant number of tourists. The Traveller's Bungalow at Thalaivasal was built before 1883 by Krishnama Naidu.

References

Villages in Salem district